Bongatsara is a suburb and a rural commune in Analamanga Region, in the  Central Highlands of Madagascar. It belongs to the district of Antananarivo-Atsimondrano and its populations numbers to 22,452 in 2018.

This suburb is crossed by the National Road 7.

References

Populated places in Analamanga